This is a list of the costliest land battles of the American Civil War, measured by casualties (killed, wounded, captured, and missing) on both sides.

Highest casualty battles

See also

 List of American Civil War battles
 Timeline of events leading to the American Civil War
 Bibliography of the American Civil War
 Bibliography of Ulysses S. Grant

Notes

American Civil War

Bat
American Civil War timelines
American Civil War
Costliest land battles, American Civil War